Juaben may refer to
Ejisu-Juaben District
New-Juaben Municipal District

Constituency
New Juaben North Constituency (Ghana parliament constituency)
New Juaben South Constituency (Ghana parliament constituency)

Town
Juaben may also refer to:
Juaben a town in the Ashanti Region